John Petro, called 'The Junkie's Friend', was Polish and came to the UK in 1916. During the War he worked as a doctor with Alexander Fleming giving penicillin to the troops. In 1966, having been run down by a car, he was unable to work and soon got into debt. He was made bankrupt in 1967. He said he was unable to find premises, so he gave out prescriptions for drugs anywhere. He was thought to be selling prescriptions to addicts, which led to him being nicknamed the 'Junkie's Friend'. After pleading guilty at Marylebone Magistrates Court, in February 1968, he was fined £1700.

When he was prevented from prescribing any listed dangerous drug, he began to prescribe Methedrine (methamphetamine hydrochloride) in injectable form in ever larger amounts, as this was not then regulated under the Dangerous Drugs Act. Methedrine was a major contributor to the drugs scene, and produced an epidemic at the time. This led finally to him being struck off the Medical Register in May 1968.

References

Substance dependence
20th-century English medical doctors
Polish emigrants to the United Kingdom